The 1929 California Golden Bears football team was an American football team that represented the University of California, Berkeley in the Pacific Coast Conference (PCC) during the 1929 college football season. In their fourth year under head coach Nibs Price, the team compiled a 7–1–1 record (4–1 against PCC opponents), finished in a tie for third place in the PCC, and outscored its opponents by a combined total of 155 to 78.

Schedule

References

California
California Golden Bears football seasons
California Golden Bears football